Integrity> is the third album by grime rapper Jme, It was released on 4 May 2015 independently on Boy Better Know. Throughout the years leading up to the album, Jme released numerous singles such as "96 Fuckries" and "Work" that were included on the track list of Integrity>. "Calm" was originally credited as Tommy Kruise featuring Jme, and appeared on his October 2014 EP entitled Fête Foreign. The album was commercially successful, entering the UK Albums Chart at number 12. It is one of the 19 records nominated for the IMPALA Album of the Year Award 2015.

The album features guest appearances from fellow Boy Better Know MCs Skepta, Frisco, Shorty, Jammer and British rappers Giggs, Wiley, D Double E and Big Narstie. Production varies from Jme, Preditah, Swifta Beater, Deeco and Rude Kid, among others. On 8 January 2016, the instrumentals for the entire album were released on limited edition clear vinyl.

The first single "96 Fuckries" narrowly missed on the Top 40, entering at number 41, becoming Jme's highest-charting solo single.

Chart performance
Integrity> entered the UK Albums Chart at number 12, becoming Jme's highest-charting album and first top 40 album. In its second week of charting it remained in the top 40 at number 32. The album spent 4 weeks on the Albums Chart. On the UK R&B Chart it entered at number 1 and number 7 on the UK Download Chart.

Track listing

Charts

References

Jme (musician) albums
2015 albums